Elachista japonica is a moth in the family Elachistidae. It was described by Parenti in 1983. It is found in Japan.

References

Moths described in 1983
japonica
Moths of Japan